Girls artistic gymnastics qualification at the 2014 Summer Youth Olympics was held at the Nanjing Olympic Sports Centre on August 18. The results of the qualification determined the qualifiers to the finals: 18 gymnasts in the all-around final, and 8 gymnasts in each of 4 apparatus finals.

Start List

Results

References 
Artistic Gymnastics Women's All-Around Qualification

Gymnastics at the 2014 Summer Youth Olympics